Laxmi Bai Nagar is a VIP residential colony in New Delhi, India. Laxmi Bai, meaning "city of Lakshmibai", is named for the Rani (queen) of the Maratha-ruled Jhansi State in India, which is now a province of modern Uttar Pradesh state. She fought for independence from the British Raj during the Indian Rebellion of 1857 and died in combat.

Laxmi Bai Nagar hosts doctors and staff of Central Government Health Scheme and serves as official residences for many civil servants to the Union Government and other employees of the government.

Laxmi Bai Nagar largely hosts doctors and staff of Central Government Health Scheme having 2000 govt. Flats & 24 Private Flats opposite N P Co. Edu. School. 

Having two local markets, one taxi stand, three bus stands, one dispensary, two gyms, two barat ghars, one gurudwara, five temples, five schools & equipped with all civic amentities.

Attractions

 Sanjay Gandhi Lake Park
 Sarojini Nagar Market
 Dilli Haat
 INA Market
 Lodhi Gardens 
 Safdarjung's Tomb
 South Extension Market
 Kidwai Nagar West
 Mini Market, adjacent Barat Ghar
 NDMC BARAT GHAR
 Chitra working Girls Hostel
 Grih Kalyan Kendra

Local Restaurants

 Rang De Basanti Dhaba
 Amar Jyoti
 Haldiram's
 McDonald's
 Khatta Meetha
 Domino's
harmesh cafe

Educational Institutions

Senior Navyug School
D.T.E.A. Senior Secondary School
Govt. Boys  Senior Secondary School
Govt. Girls  Senior Secondary School
N P Co-Ed Secondary School

References

Neighbourhoods in Delhi
New Delhi district
Cities and towns in New Delhi district